This is a list of Royal Navy ships and personnel lost during World War II, from 3 September 1939 to 1 October 1945.

See also List of ships of the Royal Navy.

Personnel losses 
The Royal Navy lost 50,758 men killed in action, 820 missing in action and 14,663 wounded in action.
The Women's Royal Naval Service lost 102 killed and 22 wounded.

Battleships
The Royal Navy lost 3 battleships:

Battlecruisers
The Royal Navy lost 2 battlecruisers:

Aircraft carriers
The Royal Navy lost 5 fleet carriers:

Escort aircraft carriers
The Royal Navy lost 3 escort carriers:

Cruisers
The Royal Navy lost 28 cruisers according to Roskill, and 34 including Commonwealth/Dominion ships, according to the Naval-History project. 27 are listed; in addition  was severely damaged by German air attack on 9 October 1943, not fully repaired, and became a base ship at Alexandria, Egypt.

Destroyers
The Royal Navy lost 132 destroyers, according to Roskill and 153 including Commonwealth/Dominion ships, according to the Naval-History project.

Submarines
The Royal Navy lost 74 submarines.

Minelayers
The Royal Navy lost 8 minelayers.

Minesweepers
The Royal Navy lost 32 minesweepers.

Others 
The Royal Navy lost 10 frigates, 22 corvettes, 10 sloops, 15 auxiliary cruisers and 1,035 smaller units, including those lent to Commonwealth and other allied naval forces.

Damage Caused

Surface ships caused the loss of 63 warships, comprising:
 1 capital ship
 1 aircraft carrier
 8 cruisers
 24 destroyers 
 29 submarines
Enemy submarines sank 54 warships, including:
 2 capital ships
 5 carriers
 9 cruisers
 33 destroyers
 5 submarines
Enemy aircraft sank 77 warships, including:
 2 capital ships
 1 carrier
 12 cruisers
 55 destroyers 
 7 submarines
Mines caused the loss of 54 warships, including:
 2 cruisers
 26 destroyers 
 26 submarines
Shore defenses sank two destroyers, while one carrier, three cruisers, 15 destroyers and nine submarines were lost to accidents or unknown causes.

Damage inflicted by enemy
German forces sank 162 warships, including:
 2 battleships
 1 battlecruiser
 6 carriers
 15 cruisers
 114 destroyers 
 24 submarines
Italian forces sank 58 warships, including:
 6 cruisers
 15 destroyers 
 37 submarines
Japanese forces sank 19 warships, including:
 1 battleship
 1 battlecruiser
 1 carrier
 3 cruisers
 10 destroyers 
 4 submarines

A further destroyer and two sloops were lost to Vichy French shore batteries and warships.

See also
 List of United States Navy losses in World War II

References

Literature
 Stephen Roskill: "Royal Navy - Britische Seekriegsgeschichte 1939-1945", Gerhard Stalling Verlag, 1961

World War II losses list
Royal Navy losses in World War II

Lists of Royal Navy ships
Royal Navy losses